KST may refer to:
 Korea Standard Time
 Koren Specific Technique, a new age chiropractic technique
 Korps Speciale Troepen, a Dutch special forces unit.
 KST oscillator, a stock market indicator
 Kantonsschule Stadelhofen, a college in Zürich, Switzerland